Abdurrahman Cahit Zarifoğlu (1 July 1940 – 7 June 1987) was a Turkish poet and writer.

Life 

Zarifoğlu was born in Ankara in 1940 and he grew up in Kahramanmaraş. He started writing poetry during his highschool years at Kahramanmaraş High School. After highschool, he went to İstanbul and studied German Language and Literature in Istanbul University. He published his poems in Diriliş magazine. In 1976, he published some of his poems, stories, diaries and conversations in Mavera Dergisi. He was also one of the founders of this magazine.

He worked as a teacher several times. When he was publishing Mavera Dergisi, he was also working in TRT as a translator. He died in 1987. His grave is in Küplüce Cemetery in Beylerbeyi.

Bibliography

Poetry 
 İşaret Çocukları (1967)
 Yedi Güzel Adam (1973)
 Menziller (1977)
 Korku ve Yakarış (1986)
 Gülücük (1989)
 Ağaç Okul (1990)

Diaries 
 Yaşamak (1980)

Stories and Novels 
 İns (1974)
 Serçekuş (1983)
 Ağaçkakanlar (1983)
 Katıraslan (1983)
 Yürek Dede ile Padişah (1984)
 Savaş Ritmleri (1985)
 Motorlu Kuş (1987)

Theatre 
 Sütçü İmam (1987)

Essays 
 Bir Değirmendir Bu Dünya (1987)
 Zengin Hayaller Peşinde (2006)

Other 
 Okuyucularla (2009)
 Mektuplar (2010)

References

Turkish male poets
People from Ankara
1940 births
1987 deaths
Turkish translators
Burials at Küplüce Cemetery
20th-century translators
20th-century Turkish poets
20th-century Turkish male writers